Indoor athletics at the 2005 Asian Indoor Games was held in Indoor Athletics Stadium, Pattaya, Thailand from 13 November to 15 November 2005.

Medalists

Men

Women

Medal table

Results

Men

60 m
13 November

1st round

Final

400 m

1st round
13 November

Final
14 November

800 m

1st round
13 November

Final
14 November

1500 m
15 November

3000 m
14 November

60 m hurdles
14 November

4 × 400 m relay

15 November

High jump
13 November

Pole vault
13 November

Long jump
13 November

Triple jump
15 November

Shot put
15 November

Heptathlon
14–15 November

Women

60 m
13 November

1st round

Final

400 m

1st round
13 November

Final
14 November

800 m

1st round
13 November

Final
14 November

1500 m
15 November

3000 m
13 November

60 m hurdles
14 November

4 × 400 m relay

15 November

High jump
15 November

Pole vault
14 November

Long jump
15 November

Triple jump
13 November

Shot put
15 November

Pentathlon
13 November

References

 GBRathletics

2005 Asian Indoor Games events
2005
Asian Indoor